Cook County Board of Commissioners 13th district is a electoral district for the Cook County Board of Commissioners.

The district was established in 1994, when the board transitioned from holding elections in individual districts, as opposed to the previous practice of holding a set of two at-large elections (one for ten seats from the city of Chicago and another for seven seats from suburban Cook County).

Geography

1994 boundaries
When the district was first established, it covered parts of the North Side of Chicago and the northern suburbs of Cook County.

2001 redistricting
New boundaries were adopted in August 2001, with redistricting taking place following the 2000 United States Census.

In regards to townships and equivalent jurisdictions, the district's redistricted boundaries included portions of the city of Chicago and portions of the Evanston, Maine, New Trier, Niles, and Northfield townships.

2012 redistricting
The district, as redistricted in 2012 following the 2010 United States Census, largely resembled its 2001 form. It included the West Ridge and Rogers Park areas of the City of Chicago as well as Evanston, Glencoe, Glenview, Kenilworth, Lincolnwood, Morton Grove, Northbrook, Northfield, Skokie, Wilmette, and Winnetka in the north suburbs. In regards to townships and equivalent jurisdictions, it included portions of the cities of Chicago, Evanston, as well as Niles, Northfield, and New Trier townships. With Evanston and New Trier Township, the district covered their entirety. It also covered the majority of Niles Township. Only a small segment of Northfield township was included in the district. Evanston was in Evanston Township, until it dissolved in 2014.

The district was 47.75 square miles (30,562.12 acres).

Politics
The district has leaned strongly Democratic in its elections to the Cook County Board of Commissioners.

List of commissioners representing the district

Election results

|-
| colspan=16 style="text-align:center;" |Cook County Board of Commissioners 13th district general elections
|-
!Year
!Winning candidate
!Party
!Vote (pct)
!Opponent
!Party
! Vote (pct)
!Opponent
!Party
! Vote (pct)
|-
|1994
| |Calvin Sutker
| | Democratic
| | 
| | Lourdes Gagui Mon
| | Republican
| | 
|
|
|
|-
|1998
| |Calvin Sutker
| | Democratic
| | 53,277 (70.74%)
| | Ellen R. Schrodt
| | Republican
| | 22,037 (29.26%)
|
|
|
|-
|2002
| |Larry Suffredin
| | Democratic
| |59,151 (69.92%)
| | Robert D. Shearer, Jr.
| | Republican
| | 25,450 (30.08%)
|
|
|
|-
|2006
| |Larry Suffredin
| | Democratic
| |71,801 (100%)
|
|
|
|
|
|
|-
|2010
| |Larry Suffredin
| | Democratic
| |62,562 (67.71%)
| | Linda Thompson LaFianza
| | Republican
| | 24,597 (26.62%)
| | George E. Milkowski
| | Green
| | 5,241 (5.67%)
|-
|2014
| |Larry Suffredin
| | Democrat
| |68,715 (100%)
|
|
|
|
|
|
|-
|2018
| |Larry Suffredin
| | Democratic
| |95,500 (77.54%)
| | Chris J. Hanusiak
| | Republican
| | 27,662 (22.46%)
|
|
|
|-
|2022
| |Josina Morita
| | Democratic
| |70,431 (80.16%)
| | Andrew Border
| | Republican
| | 17,435 (19.84%)
|
|
|

References

Cook County Board of Commissioners districts
Constituencies established in 1994
1994 establishments in Illinois